Cheswell is a hamlet in Shropshire, England on the edge of the Weald Moors.

The settlement is overlooked by a rocky, sandstone edge called Cheswell Hill, which gives the place its name. The old name - Chrestill - is thought to mean 'Christ's Hill' or 'the hill with a cross'.

There a number of substantial brick buildings, including the Manor, Grange and Lodge, surrounded by damp, reclaimed farmland.

See also
Listed buildings in Church Aston

References

Raven, Michael, 'A Guide to Shropshire', Michael Raven, 2005, 0906114349.

Hamlets in Shropshire